A troubadour was a composer and performer of Old Occitan lyric poetry during the High Middle Ages.

Troubadour, or variants, may also refer to:

Music
The Troubadours, an English rock band
The Troubadors, a 1950's American band that backed Jane Morgan on her 1957 recording of "Fascination."
Troubadour (George Strait album), 2008
"Troubadour" (song)
Troubadour (J. J. Cale album), 1976
Troubadour (K'naan album), 2009
Troubadour (The Stepkids album), 2013
Troubadour: The Definitive Collection 1964–1976, a 1992 compilation album by Donovan
"Troubadours", a song by Van Morrison from the 1979 album Into the Music
"The Troubadour", a song by A. C. Newman from the 2012 album Shut Down the Streets
Troubadour Music Inc., Raffi's music label
"De troubadour", one of the four winners of the Eurovision Song Contest 1969

Venues
Troubadour (London nightclub), a coffee house and music venue
Troubadour (West Hollywood nightclub), a night club and music venue 
Bristol Troubadour Club, a former British music venue

Other uses
Troubadour (horse) (1882–1906), an American Thoroughbred racehorse
Troubador, a fictional character in the Oh My Goddess anime/manga series
Troubador, a poet of the Galician-Portuguese lyric movement
Troubador Press, a San Francisco book publishing company founded by Malcolm Whyte
Il trovatore ('The Troubador'), an opera by Giuseppe Verdi

See also

Live at the Troubadour (disambiguation)
Trobairitz, a female troubadour
Twoubadou, a Haitian folk music genre
Troubadour, TX, an American documentary television series